= U.S. Army Community Relations =

The U.S. Army Community Relations Division (CRD), headquartered at the Pentagon, serves as the Army's senior outreach activity for the Office of the Chief of Public Affairs (OCPA). Through events and relationships with a wide spectrum of businesses, organizations, and local community and education leaders, CRD communicates Soldiers’ stories through a variety of mediums and brings the Nation closer to the Soldiers who serve them. With hundreds of thousands of Soldiers serving in today's Army, CRD matches the right Soldiers and families to tell specific stories at public events, celebrations, parades, military expositions, and other public venues. CRD also coordinates media events and writes feature articles for placement in publications and provides expertise and consultation for feature films, documentaries, and books to ensure the Army's Soldiers and their families are accurately portrayed to the American people. The division also provides executive-level media training to senior Army leaders, ensuring the Army's story is told effectively to the media and other audiences around the world.

== Organization ==
CRD is directed by an active duty colonel. It is one of four other divisions at OCPA, the others being Media Relations, Online and Social Media, Strategic Communications and Planning, and Resources Management. CRD is organized into several teams and regional offices. The teams comprise Community Outreach, Community Relations, and Executive Communications. With regional offices in Chicago, Los Angeles, and New York City, the division conducts outreach efforts and serves as a positive Army presence in these regions. In addition to these offices, CRD's network includes the Army National Guard and Army Reserve, who provide outreach in every state in the country and Army installations around the world. These combine to ensure a unified and responsive presence that works hard to answer questions from the public and to support events.
